Edward Faitoute Condict Young (January 25, 1835 – December 6, 1908) or E.F.C. Young, was a banker, manufacturer and politician, who unsuccessfully sought the Democratic nomination for Governor of New Jersey in 1892. He was President of First National Bank in Jersey City until his death in 1908.

Biography
He was elected the City Treasurer of Jersey City from 1865 to 1870, and was a Jersey City alderman from 1872 to 1873. In 1874, he was elected to the Hudson County, New Jersey Board of Chosen Freeholders and in 1876 became the first director-at-large. He was a member of the New Jersey Democratic State Committee over several years. In 1887, he was appointed to the Tax Adjustment Commission and in 1899 was appointed to the New Jersey Railroad for a four-year term.

Death
He was critically ill starting on July 11, 1908, and he died in Jersey City on Sunday, December 6, 1908. He was buried in Bayview – New York Bay Cemetery. He was survived by his wife Harriet (1836-1924), daughter Hattie Louise Young Smith (1857-?), and son Edward Louis Young (1861-1940).

References

External links

NJCU Jersey City Past and Present: Young, E.F.C. (1835-1908)

1835 births
1908 deaths
County commissioners in New Jersey
Businesspeople from Jersey City, New Jersey
Burials at Bayview – New York Bay Cemetery
19th-century American politicians
19th-century American businesspeople